The St. George Hotel in Volcano, California, in Amador County, California. It was built in 1867, after the two previous hotels burned; Empire Hotel, and George Hotel, originally built as a boarding house in 1852. It was listed on the National Register of Historic Places in 1984.

It is a three-story, brick, hotel with 14 hotel rooms, reflecting Greek Revival influence.  It faces west onto Main St. (now also known as Pine Grove-Volcano Road).  Its 1983 National Register nomination asserted it was "the most impressive building" in town, and that it appeared "much the same ... as it was in 1880, thirteen years after it opened."

See also
Drury Melone

References

External links

Hotels in California
National Register of Historic Places in Amador County, California
Greek Revival architecture in California
Buildings and structures completed in 1867